The 2011–12 Austrian Football Bundesliga was the 100th season of top-tier football in Austria  and was contested by ten teams. The Austrian football champion was determined in four heats. The championship began on 16 July 2011 and ended on 17 May 2012 with the completion of the 36th and final round.

The champion was Red Bull Salzburg for the seventh time. Rapid Wien was the runner-up by six points. While Salzburg became eligible for the qualification to the UEFA Champions League (second round) by winning the championship, Rapid and third-place Admira Wacker Mödling – the most successful promoted team in Bundesliga history – became eligible to play in a qualification for the UEFA Europa League (second round). Sixth-place SV Ried was also eligible because of its participation in the cup final of the Europa League.

Kapfenberger SV ended the championship in last place and therefore had to move down to the second-level First League after four seasons in the Bundesliga.

Overview 

Supported by the sports betting provider tipp3 as the main sponsor, the Bundesliga is the highest league in Austrian soccer and held its 92nd season in 2011–12.  The secondary sponsor is the mobile service provider T-Mobile Austria which is the reason why the official name of the league is tipp3-Bundesliga powered by T-Mobile.  After six years, the promoted club FC Admira Wacker was again represented in Austria’s highest league.  The team replaced the relegated club LASK Linz.

With the exception of Vorarlberg and Carinthia, all Austrian federal states were represented in the Bundesliga.  Vienna, Lower Austria, and Styria each had two clubs.

The television provider sky Deutschland had the rights to show all Bundesliga matches in full length, which were broadcast in a pay television format on the channel sky sport austria. For the first time, the station showed all games not only in the well-known conference circuit but also individual matches.  In addition, ORF had the broadcasting rights to each “Top Match of the Round” – mostly on Sundays, but also on Wednesdays for weekday rounds.  This arrangement did not apply in the last two rounds, in which all games had to be held at the same time.  Consequently, ORF was permitted to show a 45-minute summary of the remaining four matches in each round.

Method
In the 2011–12 season, ten clubs competed against each other in a total of 36 rounds as had been done in previous years.  The draw was redone after the ninth and 27th rounds.  Each team thus played against every other team twice at home and twice away.

The champion Red Bull Salzburg was eligible for the second qualification round for the 2012–13 UEFA Champions League.  The second and third place clubs (Rapid Wien and Trenkwalder Admira) as well as the Austrian Cup winner were eligible to start in the second or third qualification round for the 2012–13 UEFA Europa League. Should the Austrian Cup winner also be Austrian champion, the loser of the cup final would start in the Europa League. The tenth-place club, Kapfenberger SV, had to move down to the second level league, the First League.

League table

Results 

The match table below displays the results of all games in the season.  The home team is listed in the left column and the away team in the upper row.  The home team’s score is listed first.

First half of season

Second half of season

Goal scoring statistics

Cities, venues, and attendance

The champions Red Bull Salzburg

References

External links
 Bundesliga website 

Austrian Football Bundesliga seasons
Austria
1